Present arms is a two-part drill command used by many militaries and public safety professionals in the world as a sign of respect. It comes from the old British command "Arms to the present!"
This was used especially between 1700 and about the late nineteenth century in Great Britain
and later the United Kingdom.

By country

Australia
Within the Australian Defence Force, the command "Present Arms" is executed using the following procedures.

 If unarmed, a salute is rendered (although this is usually given by the command "To the front salute")
 If armed with a F88 Austeyr; the command is "PRESENT - ARMS". For instructional purposes the movement is divided into two parts.
'PRESENT ARMS BY NUMBERS - ONE'. Move the right forearm smartly upward, bringing the rifle to a vertical position, the front handgrip in line with the right shoulder.
 'BY NUMBERS - TWO'. Raise the right foot through the position of mark time and place it on the ground with the instep against the left heel, the foot at the same angle as for the position of attention. At the same time bring the left arm smartly across the body, forearm parallel to the ground, elbow against the body, hand against the base of the pistol grip with the fingers extended and together, and the thumb on top of the forefinger.

 If armed with a 7.62mm SLR the command is "Present - Arms". This movement is divided up into 2 parts. The timing is "1, 2-3, 1".
 On the first "1", the rifle is flung from the shoulder to a position directly centered and perpendicular to the parade ground. At the same time, the left hand is brought up sharply and is to grasp the rifle just above the magazine. 
 On the second "1", the right hand moves sharply from a grasp around the pistol grip to a "goose neck" grip directly above the rear sight or directly below the rear sight on the small of the butt. At the same time, the right foot moves to the "break step" position (i.e. the right foot is behind the left foot on a 45° angle - the left heel inside the right instep), this is executed through the proper "Mark Time" position.

 If armed with a sword, the command is "Present - Arms". This movement is divided into 2 parts. As with the SLR, the timing is "1, 2-3, 1". 
 On the first "1", the sword is brought to the "recover" position (i.e. in a vertical position, handle in front of the face, 10 cm from the mouth, guard to left). 
 On the second "1", the sword is lowered in a sweeping motion towards the front, the tip of the sword is 30 cm from the ground, guard to the left and inline with the seam of the trousers.

Finland 
The command in Finnish military is "ETEEN - VIE!".

France 
The current standard weapon of the French Military is the FAMAS, a short, bullpup assault rifle worn slung in diagonal over the chest; consequently, at the command "Présentez... armes !", French military personnel will put the right hand flat over the handle of the weapon, and take hold of the received handguard with the left. The rifle itself does not move.

Officers and non-commissioned officers holding a sword or sabre present it vertically, with the guard in front of the face. Absent a weapon, the standard military salute is rendered, hand above the right eye, palm facing forward.

Indonesia 
In Indonesia, present arms is given the command in Indonesian: Hormat Senjata, Gerak! (weapon salute) for personnel carrying arms. The command Hormat, Gerak! is the command for personnel not carrying arms and is to execute a hand salute. For commands only to officers carrying swords (sabres), the command would be: Hormat Pedang, Gerak!, but when officers who parade with men carrying rifles in a ceremony, the Hormat Senjata, Gerak! command is used.

In some occasions usually during parades, personnel who are carrying rifles with the position of "Slinged-port Arms" (slinged rifle is brought to the front of the body in "port arms" position), the present arms would be different, the execution is to place the right hand flat over the folded stock of the rifle and the left hand is to hold the handguard. (See Present Arms-2 image below)

Officers execute present arms with a Sabre in two steps, first is to bring the grip of the sabre to the front of the mouth facing the guard to the left, and then bringing the sabre down to the right lower side of the body next to the right leg facing the blade to the ground in a 30 degree angle to the right.

Iran 
In Iran, they use command "پیش فنگ","pish fang", which means to hold the gun in front of the body.

Russia/Commonwealth of Independent States 
For the Russian military, the command Na k'rah-ool! (На Караул!) or On Guard is the command used for Present Arms. The preparatory command before present arms is Eyes on the Right and/or Eyes on the Left or Eyes on the Front.

With a rifle (SKS), present arms is carried out in two steps:

 Holding the rifle with the right hand, personnel will put the hand up to the head in a vertical position.
 Then, the personnel will have raise the rifle to the center of the chest, holding the rifle neck with the left.
 Finally, the right hand is to be moved to barrel of the rifle, all while keeping it straight.

When carrying an assault rifle, such as an AK-74M (the standard service rifle of the Russian Ground Forces) personnel will put the left hand flat over the neck of the weapon, while the right hand, which should have by default been on the barrel of the gun, stays the same.

When performing an unarmed present arms, the right hand is brought to the right temple, while not quite, touching; the head has to be covered.

The same format is also used by countries in the Russian led Commonwealth of Independent States (CIS), which includes countries such as Belarus, Armenia, and Tajikistan. Ukraine has conducted the command differently since the fall of the Soviet Union, executing it similarly to the Polish version.

Singapore
In the Singapore Armed Forces, the command Hormat Senja-ta is given. A full arms salute is given to Officers of rank Major and above. A butt salute, with presentation of weapon and left arm at trigger is given to junior officers. In sword drill, the sword is raised, an act of kissing, then lowered in an 8-beat. The sword is pulled back fully.

United Kingdom 
In the UK, the present arms is given with the SA80 service weapon, or a sword if appropriate.

Rifle 
With the SA80, according to the RAF Drill and Ceremonial manual (AP818), the movement starts with arms at the slope. Firstly, the right arm is moved across the body to strike and grip the butt, keeping the arm parallel to the ground. Next, the right arm is to move the rifle across to the centre of the body, keeping it vertical, with the magazine pointed outwards, whilst the left hand is to be moved 6 inches in front of the rifle. The rifle is then moved down until the right arm is as extended as it can be, with the rifle kept vertically in front of the body, with the left hand striking and gripping the rifle shortly above the trigger guard. The right foot is then moved (in the Army and RAF the leg is bent to 90 degrees, in the navy this is not the case), and placed so that the hollow of the right foot is touching the heel of the left, at an angle of 30 degrees.

Sword 
With the sword (usually carried by officers and, in some cases, warrant officers), the present arms is identical to that of the salute at the halt. The sword is first moved up to a position called the recover (the blade is vertical, turned to the left, with the tip uppermost, and the hilt in front of the face before the mouth), before being lowered smoothly to the front, in line with the right shoulder, with the hilt resting behind the thigh, blade edge to the left, and the tip approximately 30 cm from the ground. When the command for rifles to be shouldered is given (shoulder - ARMS), this process is reversed.

United States
Within the United States Military, it is executed in the following procedures:

 If unarmed, or armed with only a side arm, a hand salute is rendered.
 If armed with a firearm, present the underside of the firearm towards the one receiving the honour.
 If bearing a guidon, lower the guidon to a horizontal position with the lower portion of the staff resting in the pit of the right arm.
 If armed with a sword or sabre, on the first count raise the sword vertically or at a 30-degree angle from vertical, depending on the branch of the military, with the sword grip 6 inches in front of the neck, and then on the second count lower the sword to the right side, pointing at the ground at a 45-degree angle, with the right hand or knuckle bow next to the pant seam. The true edge is always to the left during the whole procedure of "present sword."

As with all proper commands, it is to be given from the position of attention only.

Following "Present arms", the command "Order arms" (also a two-part command) is given to return to the proper position of attention.

References

External links 

Military life
Police culture
Military commands